Hi-Fi Revival is the sixth studio album released by The O.C. Supertones. It was the first of three sessions the Supertones recorded in Franklin, Tennessee at Dark Horse Studios. Matt Morginsky and Ethan Luck lived together at this time and demoed over 50 songs for Hi-Fi Revival in their basement. 17 of the un-used songs made it on to their side-project album, Grand Incredible. The rest of the demos were never released. CCM characterized the sound on this album as displaying stripped down ska core rhythms, with the horn section now "providing color instead of the dominant sound."

Track listing
 "Superfly"
 "Brand New Thing"
 "Welcome Home"
 "Hold on to Jesus"
 "Go Go Go"
 "Let It Go"
 "Just a Man"
 "Attitude"
 "Perfect Love"
 "Fire"
 "Birth of Uncool"
 "Go Your Way"
 "Radio Plays"
 "Forever"
 "Glory Hallelujah"

Personnel
 Matt "Mojo" Morginsky – lead vocals
 Ethan Luck – guitars
 Tony Terusa – bass guitar
 John Wilson – drums
 Darren Mettler – trumpet
 Daniel Spencer – trombone

References

2002 albums
The O.C. Supertones albums